The Çat Dam is an embankment dam on the Abdülharap River, located near Çelikhan in Adıyaman Province, Turkey. Constructed between 1985 and 2002, the development was backed by the Turkish State Hydraulic Works.

See also
List of dams and reservoirs in Turkey

References

Dams in Malatya Province
Dams completed in 2002
Dams in the Euphrates River basin
2002 establishments in Turkey